The Ambassador Extraordinary and Plenipotentiary of Ukraine to the Russian Federation was the ambassador of Ukraine to Russia. In March 2014 Ukraine recalled its ambassador and was represented by its temporary chargé d'affaires. In June 2014 Ukrainian President Petro Poroshenko stated that bilateral relations with Russia cannot be normalized unless Russia undoes its unilateral annexation of Crimea and returns its control of Crimea to Ukraine. Ukraine severed diplomatic relations with Russia and evacuated its entire embassy personnel from Moscow on 24 February 2022, when Russia launched the invasion of Ukraine.

The first Ukrainian ambassador to Russia assumed his post in 1992, the same year a Ukrainian embassy opened in Moscow. During the Soviet time, the embassy of Ukraine to Russia was called the Permanent Delegation of Government of Ukraine to the Council of Ministers of the Soviet Union.

List of representatives

Cossack Hetmanate
 1649–1649 Syluyan Muzhylovsky
 1653–1653 Syluyan Muzhylovsky and K. Burlyai

Ukrainian People's Republic
 1917–1917 Petro Stebnytsky (as Commissar in Affairs with Ukraine)
 1918–1918 Serhiy Shelukhin
 1919–1919 Semen Mazurenko

Council of Ministers of the Ukrainian SSR
 1921–1923 Mykhailo Poloz
 1923–1924 Anton Prykhodko
 1924–1929 Danylo Petrovsky
 1932–1932 Kyrylo Suhomlin
 1932–1935 Vasyl Poraiko
 1935–1937 Vasyl Polyakov
 1942–1944 Pavlo Rosgansky
 1944–1946 Petro Rudnycsky
 1946–1950 Nikolai Podgorny
 1950–1953 Grygoriy Onishenko
 1953–1976 Yuriy Dudin
 1976–1991 Mykhailo Pichuzhkin
 1991–1991 Volodymyr Fedorov

Ukraine
 1992–1994Volodymyr Kryzhanivsky
 1995–1999Volodymyr Fedorov
 1999–2005 Mykola Biloblotsky
 2005–2006 Leonid Osavolyuk (provisional)
 2006–2008 Oleh Dyomin
 2008–2010 Kostyantyn Gryshchenko
 2010–2010 Yevhen Herasymov (provisional)
 2010–2014 Volodymyr Yelchenko
 2015–2019 Ruslan Nimchynskyy, Chargé d'Affaires ad interim
 2019–2022 Vasyl Pokotylo, Chargé d'Affaires ad interim

See also 
 Ukrainian Embassy, Moscow
 Постійне представництво Ради Міністрів УРСР при Раді Міністрів СРСР

References

External links 
  Embassy of Ukraine to the Russian Federation: Previous Ambassadors

 
Russia
Ukraine